The 1975 Romania rugby union tour of New Zealand was a series of matches played between August and September 1975 by Romania national rugby union team in New Zealand.,

It was the second tour overseas of a Romanian team after the tour in Argentina in 1973.

No official tests were plated, the match clou was the final match against Junior All Blacks. Romanian obtained an historical draw.

Results 

Scores and results list Romania's points tally first.

References 
 

1975 rugby union tours
1975 in New Zealand rugby union
1975 in Romanian sport
1975
Rugby union tours of New Zealand
1975–76 in European rugby union